Different gymnastics disciplines have been contested at the South American Games. Artistic gymnastics has been part of the program since 1978. Rhythmic gymnastics was first introduced in 1990. Trampoline gymnastics entered the program in 2018.

Editions

All-time medal table

Best results by event and nation

See also
 South American Gymnastics Championships

References

 
South American Games
Gymnastics